Olivo is both a Spanish, Italian, and French surname and a masculine given name, and it referred to someone who grew olives. Notable people with the name include:

Surname:
America Olivo (born 1978), American actress and singer
Brock Olivo (born 1976), American football player
Chi-Chi Olivo (1928–1977), Dominican Republic baseball player
Daniel Olivo (born 1989), American businessman and healthcare professional
Diomedes Olivo (1919–1977), Dominican Republic baseball player
Dora Olivo (born 1943), American politician
Frank Olivo, American politician
Horacio Olivo, Puerto Rican actor and comedian
Karen Olivo (born 1976), American actress
Miguel Olivo (born 1978), Dominican Republic baseball player
Raúl Olivo, Venezuelan actor
Renzo Olivo (born 1992), Argentine tennis player
Roberto Olivo (1914–2005), Venezuelan professional baseball umpire
Rosario Olivo (born 1940), Italian politician

Given name:
Olivo Barbieri (born 1954), Italian artist and photographer
Olivo Krause (1857–1927), Danish oboist and composer

See also
Olivo (Mexico City Metrobús), a BRT station in Mexico City
Olivos (disambiguation)

Masculine given names